Chumak is a Swedish-Ukrainian food processing company located in Kakhovka, Kherson Oblast. It is today one of Ukraine's biggest food processing companies and has commercial offices in Kyiv, Minsk and Moscow. Among its products are ketchup, mayonnaise, pasta, salad dressings, cooking sauces, canned vegetables, marinated vegetables, tomato juice and sunflower oil. Chumak is the largest tomato processing company in Central and Eastern Europe. The company currently (2010) employs about 1200 people and has a revenue of about 48 million Euros.

The company was founded in 1996, first under the name South Food, Inc, by the two young Swedish entrepreneurs Johan Bodén and his nephew Carl Sturén. They soon got financial help from Hans Rausing of Tetra Pak who got 66,7% of the company. The latter sold his share of the company in early 2008 to the Swedish investment company East Capital (22,2%) and the Ukrainian investment bank Dragon (44,5%). As of 2013, Chumak was the second largest producer of ketchup in Ukraine, with a share of 25.00%.

References

External links
 Chumak's official homepage

Food and drink companies of Ukraine
Ukrainian companies established in 1996
Condiment companies